Baykan is a municipality in the Baykan District of the Siirt Province in Turkey. It is populated by Kurds and had a population of 5,544 in 2021.

Neighborhoods 
Baykan is divided into the neighborhoods of Cefan, Havel, İnönü, Karşıyaka and Yenidoğan.

Politics 
In the local elections in March 2019 Ramazan Sarsılmaz from the Peoples' Democratic Party (HDP) was elected mayor. Mehmet Tunç was appointed Kaymakam in September 2018. On 15 May 2020, Sarsılmaz was dismissed from his post, and Mehmet Tunç was appointed as the trustee of the municipality.

References

Populated places in Siirt Province

Kurdish settlements in Siirt Province